Zanuqabad (also Romanized as Zānūqābād; also known as Zāghābād, Z̄ājābād, Zanoogh Abad, and Zāqābād) is a village in Bahreman Rural District, Nuq District, Rafsanjan County, Kerman Province, Iran. At the 2006 census, its population was 127, in 34 families.

References 

Populated places in Rafsanjan County